The 2004–05 Barys Astana season was the 6th season in the Kazakhstan Hockey Championship and the 1st season in the First League of the Russian Ice Hockey Championship, in parallel.

Kazakhstan Hockey Championship

Standings

Schedule and results

References

Barys Astana seasons
Barys